Nabila Idoughi (born 3 November 1986) is a French-born Algerian former footballer who played as a defender. She has been a member of the Algeria women's national team.

Club career
Idoughi has played for Bagneux in France.

International career
Idoughi capped for Algeria at senior level during the 2006 African Women's Championship.

References

1986 births
Living people
Algerian women's footballers
Women's association football defenders
Algeria women's international footballers
Footballers from Hauts-de-Seine
French women's footballers
French sportspeople of Algerian descent